Henry Clifton Sorby (10 May 1826 – 9 March 1908) was an English microscopist and geologist. His major contribution was the development of techniques for studying iron and steel with microscopes. This paved the way for the mass production of steel.

Biography
Sorby was born at Woodbourne, near Sheffield in Yorkshire, and attended Sheffield Collegiate School. He early on developed an interest in natural science. One of his first papers related to the excavation of valleys in Yorkshire. In 1847, when he was 21, his father died, leaving him a comfortable private income. He immediately established a scientific laboratory and workshop at his home. He subsequently dealt with the physical geography of former geological periods, with the wave-structure in certain stratified rocks, and the origin of slaty cleavage.

He took up the study of rocks and minerals under the microscope, and published an important memoir, "On the Microscopical Structure of Crystals", in 1858 (Quart. Journ. Geol. Soc.). In England, he was one of the pioneers in petrography; he was awarded the Wollaston medal by the Geological Society of London in 1869, and became its president. In his presidential addresses, Sorby gave the results of original research on the structure and origin of limestones and of non-calcareous stratified rocks (1879–1880).

In 1863, he used etching with acid to study the microscopic structure of iron and steel. Using this technique, he was the first in England to understand that a small but precise quantity of carbon gave steel its strength. This paved the way for Henry Bessemer and Robert Forester Mushet to develop the method for mass-producing steel. Due to this accomplishment, Sorby is known to modern metallurgists as the "father of metallography", with an award bearing his name being offered by the International Metallographic Society for lifetime achievement.

His interests were broad. He published essays on the construction and use of the micro-spectroscope in the study of animal and vegetable colouring matter and on the temperature of the water in estuaries. He also applied his skill in making preparations of invertebrate animals for lantern slides. Furthermore, he once estimated "one cubic thousandth of an inch of water to contain 3.7x10^15 molecules."

He was president of the Royal Microscopical Society. In 1882, he was elected president of Firth College, Sheffield after the death of founder Mark Firth. Sorby also worked hard for the establishment of the University of Sheffield, which was eventually founded in 1905. A university hall of residence, Sorby Hall, built in the 1960s and demolished in August 2006, was named after him.

He died in Sheffield and was buried in Ecclesall churchyard.

Honours and awards

He was elected a Fellow of the Royal Society in June 1857 as one who was Author of various papers on Slaty Cleavage; on the peculiarities of stratification due to the action of currents & their application to the investigation of the Physical Geography of ancient periods; on the microscopical structure of limestones and other peculiarities of the physical & chemical constitution of rocks. Distinguished for his acquaintance with the science of Geology.. He delivered their Bakerian Lecture in 1863 for his work on the Direct Correlation of mechanical and Chemical Forces and was awarded their Royal Medal in 1874. In 1892, Sorby was elected a Foreign Honorary Member of the American Academy of Arts and Sciences.

Both the International Association of Sedimentologists  and the Yorkshire Geological Society have Sorby Medals named in honour of his achievements in geology. The Henry Clifton Sorby Award is offered by the International Metallographic Society in recognition of lifetime achievement in metallurgy. The University of Sheffield has a chair of geology/physical geology named after him and the Sorby Natural History Society  is named after Sorby. The area in which the society operates (north East Derbyshire, the Sheffield and Chesterfield areas) are known to members as 'Sorbyshire'.

Dorsa Sorby on the Moon is named after him. There is also a wing at the Northern General Hospital named after him.

References

Attribution

External links
 Biographical material, Sorby Natural History Society, Sheffield
 Sorby Medal, International Association of Sedimentologists 
 Sorby Medal, Yorkshire Geological Society
 H.Clifton Sorby Award, International Metallographic Society

1826 births
1908 deaths
19th-century British geologists
Microscopists
British metallurgists
Royal Medal winners
Wollaston Medal winners
Fellows of the American Academy of Arts and Sciences
Fellows of the Royal Society
Fellows of the Royal Microscopical Society
People educated at Sheffield Collegiate School